Florentino Fernández may refer to:

 Florentino Fernández (actor) (born 1972), Spanish actor, comedian, conductor and showman
 Florentino Fernández (boxer) (1936–2013), Cuban boxer